Gyan Singh Sohanpal (11 January 1925 – 8 August 2017), was an Indian politician affiliated with the Indian National Congress and a member of the West Bengal Legislative Assembly. He is affectionately known as Chacha Ji ("Uncle" in English) in his constituency of Kharagpur Sadar.

He won his seat Kharagpur Sadar in 1969, 1971, 1972, 1982, 1987, 1991, 1996, 2001, 2006 and 2011.

Since 1969, he only lost elections in 1977 and 2016 when he was 91 years old.

He was MLA for 10 terms.

He contested his first election in 1962 and became a minister in 1969 in Ajoy Mukherjee’s cabinet, taking charge of Small Industries and Jails. In Siddhartha Shankar Ray’s cabinet, he was the Minister for Transport, Jail and Parliamentary Affairs. He has represented Khragpur since 1982, and in the 2011 election, he defeated Anil Kumar Das of the CPI(M) by over 32,000 votes. Following that election, he was the most senior Member of the Legislative Assembly of West Bengal and served briefly as Speaker of the Legislative Assembly. He was sworn in as the Speaker by Governor M. K. Narayanan on May 18, 2011.

References 

1925 births
2017 deaths
Indian National Congress politicians from West Bengal
Speakers of the West Bengal Legislative Assembly
Indian Sikhs
People from Kharagpur
West Bengal MLAs 1969–1971
West Bengal MLAs 1972–1977
West Bengal MLAs 1982–1987
West Bengal MLAs 1987–1991
West Bengal MLAs 1991–1996
West Bengal MLAs 1996–2001
West Bengal MLAs 2001–2006
West Bengal MLAs 2006–2011
West Bengal MLAs 2011–2016